In sport, the Fourth Division, also called Division 4 or Division IV, is often the fourth-highest division of a league, and will often have promotion and relegation with divisions above and below.

Association football
 Belgian Fourth Division, lowest nationwide division in the league system of Belgian football
 Belgian Fourth Division A
 Belgian Fourth Division B
 Belgian Fourth Division C
 Belgian Fourth Division D
 Cypriot Fourth Division, fourth tier football competition in Cyprus
 Czech Fourth Division, fourth tier football competition in the Czech Republic
 Egyptian Fourth Division, fourth division in the league system of Egyptian football
 Football League Fourth Division, fourth-highest level in the league system of English football
French Division 4 (disambiguation)
 Greek Fourth Division, fourth level in the league system of Greek football
 Hong Kong Fourth Division League, fifth level in the league system of Hong Kong football
 Lebanese Fourth Division, fourth division in the league system of Lebanese football
 4. divisjon, fifth tier in the league system of Norwegian football
 Swedish Football Division 4, sixth level in the league system of Swedish football
 Swedish Women's Football Division 4, sixth level in the league system of Swedish women's football
 Victorian State League Division 4, sixth tier soccer competition in Victoria, Australia

Other sports
 ICC World Cricket League Division Four
 IIHF World Championship Division IV, lowest level of the Ice Hockey World Championships

See also
 4th Division (disambiguation), for usage of the term in the military
 D4 (disambiguation)
 Division 4, Australian television police drama series

Association football leagues